Pacific Union College (PUC) is a private liberal arts college in Angwin, California affiliated with the Seventh-day Adventist Church. It is the only four-year college in Napa County, and the twelfth oldest institution of higher education in California. As a coeducational residential college with an almost exclusively undergraduate student body, most of those who attend the college are four-year students living on campus.

PUC is accredited by the WASC Senior College and University Commission and maintains various programmatic accreditations for specific programs. Enrollment at Pacific Union College is roughly 830. The college offers about 60 undergraduate majors and three master's programs organized in 25 academic departments, with its health science degrees the largest number of those sought out by students. The campus occupies  of the college's  in property.

History

Early years (1882–1908) 
Pacific Union College was founded as Healdsburg Academy in Healdsburg, California, in northern Sonoma County, in 1882. The creation of schools in the state was urged by Ellen G. White and other church leaders in an effort to accommodate the Adventist Church's growing membership on the West Coast and to educate young Adventists in its cause. The academy officially opened on April 11 of that year. It was the twelfth institution of higher education founded in California, and is the second founded by the Adventist Church, the first west of the Mississippi River.

Sidney Brownsberger served as its first President. Under his term, the academy focused on both conventional study of standard subjects as well as practical skills, such as dressmaking, blacksmithing, and cooking, in line with White's desire for the college. The lengthy tenure of William C. Grainger saw the heyday of the Academy's early years, but with the turn of the century, poor financial management led to increasing debt that eventually forced the academy to close in July 1908.

Move to Angwin (1909–1921) 

Despite this failure, many church leaders – including White herself – continued to push for expanded Adventist schooling, and efforts were begun in the 1900s to find a new location to rebuild the college. Many sites were scouted out in the Central Valley and elsewhere within the state, but none came to the satisfaction of the searchers.

Eventually, in 1909, the Pacific Union Conference announced that it had found a location that it could purchase: the 1,636 acres of the Angwin Resort, on Howell Mountain in neighboring Napa County. The property had been found through the church's St. Helena Sanitarium, and White visited the site in September in 1909. Satisfied with the condition of its facilities and living quarters and the ease with which they could be adapted for teaching purposes, its abundant resources in springs and lumber, and the healthful living its geography would provide, White approved the location. The property was bought in the same month for $60,000 (roughly $1.9 million in 2022), and opened its doors September 29. The name of the college was finalized as Pacific Union College in 1910 to reflect change in location, even as it had changed names a few times before.

PUC's first president at Angwin was Charles W. Irwin, who served from the opening of the new location until 1921. During his tenure, the college saw the growth of its faculty – and subsequently educational curricula – as Irwin brought to PUC experienced colleagues with whom he had worked before. Both the faculty and student also worked self-sufficiently to expand and develop the campus through the construction of new facilities and buildings, sourced from the mountain's lumber. Irwin's strict adherence to high standards for the college set precedents for much of PUC's administration throughout the century.

Other history (1922–2022) 
In 1933, Pacific Union College became the first higher educational institution affiliated with the Adventist Church to achieve regional accreditation when it was awarded accreditation by the Northwest Association of Secondary and Higher Schools. The year before, PUC had become the first school to receive denominational accreditation. Pacific Union College also was the first Adventist school to form international affiliations; it affiliated with what is now Avondale College in Australia in 1954.

In 2006 the faculty, administration and Board of Trustees underscored PUC's commitment to undergraduate education by making a formal decision to remain a college and not change its name to university, as other small private colleges had done. This decision was based on the institution's commitment to quality liberal arts undergraduate teaching.

In the summer of 2006, PUC's Board of Trustees announced its intention to enlarge its endowment through the sale and development of a portion of its land holdings into an ecovillage. The initial plans called for 591 homes and improvements to local businesses and shops. In response to community input, the number of units proposed was later reduced by 200, to 391. The plan was abandoned in October 2010.

In June 2014, the college received a $2.4 million unrestricted donation from a local resident. It was described as the single largest cash gift in the college's history.

Pacific Union College has had a total of twenty-four presidents. The first eight of these served while the school was still in Healdsburg. In 1983, Malcolm Maxwell became the first alumnus to lead PUC, serving for a record 18 years. Ralph Trecartin, the current president, took office in July 2021 after serving as the associate provost and dean of the College of Professionals for Andrews University.

Academics 

Pacific Union College is the only four-year college located in Napa County, California. It offers around 60 undergraduate majors in various fields, along with other types of programs. Health science, business, and education are the leading fields in which students seek out degrees, and their degree programs are accredited by their respective accreditation bodies.

Curriculum 
Pacific Union College offers 44 bachelor's degree programs, 10 associate degree programs, and three master's degree programs, in addition to minors, credential programs, and pre-professional tracks. These are all organized throughout 25 academic departments. The school operates on a quarter-based academic calendar.

Though the range of its offerings is quite broad, PUC's most prominent programs are those in health care, which are sought out by a considerable number of those who attend. In the 2020–2021 school year, two-thirds of all undergraduate degrees awarded were in the medical field, and 96% of the associate's degrees awarded were for nursing.

PUC maintains an especially close connection to Loma Linda University School of Medicine, another Adventist institution, and most of the college's pre-professional programs are meant specifically for admission into Loma Linda. The college has sent a steady stream of students to the university for several decades; visiting from Loma Linda in 1925, John H. Kellogg noted that PUC was "the college that sends the largest number of medical students from any one place." Degrees in business and education follow behind as the second two most sought-after.

Similar to its emphasis on manual labor and physical health in its Healdsburg days, PUC necessitates that students takes fitness classes as part of its general education requirements. Offerings in the past have included fencing, trikke, pickleball, swimming, water aerobics, polo, canoeing, skiing, snowboarding, soccer, dance, and yoga, though many of these have since been discontinued.

Similar to other Adventist schools, PUC offers study-abroad programs through Adventist Colleges Abroad (ACA), primarily in Europe and Latin America. Most of these programs were designed for those seeking degrees from the college's World Languages Department, though non-language majors often study abroad through the ACA as well. PUC also organizes mission trips independently of ACA.

Honors program 
Pacific Union College offers an honors program to high achieving students modeled on a great books curriculum. The program replaces the general education curriculum with a series of seminars studying great books. Students in the program participate in a study tour set in Florence, Italy, before their junior year as part of a seminar studying the definition of beauty centered around Renaissance Art. Students in the program are required to complete a senior capstone project.

Rankings 
For the 2022–2023 school year, the U.S. News & World Report ranked Pacific Union College the 19th best regional college in the Western United States, a position it shares with John Paul the Great Catholic University. The Report also listed the college as the 6th Best Value School and the 8th Top Performer on Social Mobility, where it ties with MSU Northern. Niche gives the college an overall B score, and ranks it the 52nd most diverse college in the United States, with its diversity graded A+.

Accreditation and approval 
Pacific Union College has been accredited by the WASC Senior College and University Commission or its predecessor since 1951. In February 2020, however, the commission issued a formal Notice of Concern regarding the college's accreditation, citing PUC's dwindling financial resources and dramatic drops in enrollment as areas that needed improvement. Though in the years following PUC noted moderate increases in enrollment and dismissed a number of its employees in response to WSCUC's recommendations, the commission has not withdrawn its Notice of Concern. PUC is also approved by the Adventist Church's own Adventist Accrediting Association.

In addition to these two institution-wide accreditations, many of PUC's programs and departments are accredited or approved by their respective programmatic accreditation bodies, including:

 National Association of Schools of Art and Design
 National Association of Schools of Music
 California Commission on Teacher Credentialing
 International Assembly for Collegiate Business Education
 Council on Social Work Education
 Accrediting Commission for Education in Nursing

Campus and facilities 
The college is located in Angwin, on Howell Mountain overlooking the Napa Valley, 70 miles (110 km) north of San Francisco and 60 miles (85 km) from the Pacific Ocean. The main campus comprises about only  of the college's  in property. The remaining .

Since 2007, Bon Appétite has catered the PUC Dining Commons; they serve exclusively vegetarian and vegan menu items sourced from local producers, in accordance with Adventist health beliefs and the company's own catering methods. During winter 2011, the Commons saw heavy renovations which redesigned the cafeteria's architectural style and expanded its space. In 2021, supply chain shortages caused by COVID-19 disrupted the kitchen's ability to source local ingredients.

The college's main library is the Nelson Memorial Library, with holdings of around 150,000 books. It also houses the Pitcairn Islands Study Center, with "one of the world’s largest collections of material" about the islands – according to PUC's General Catalog – as well as literary collections for various figures in Adventist history. In 2011, the library was renovated at a cost of over a million dollars.

Albion Field Station 
The college owns as operates the Albion Field Station, in Mendocino County, on the Albion River by the Pacific coast. Though the station was designed for educational purposes, and PUC's biology department makes use of the river's tide pools and estuaries for course learning, its cabins and other facilities have made it a center of broader student life, and sees visits from other departments.

Angwin–Parrett Field 

Pacific Union College owns and operates Angwin–Parrett Field, a public use airport located on its campus. The airport was the landing spot during George W. Bush's presidential visit to the Napa Valley in 2006. The airport also supports PUC's Bachelor of Science degree in aviation and offers ground schools and flight instruction to the community.

Back 40 Forest 
Much of the school's undeveloped acreage is managed as the PUC Demonstration & Experimental Forest, though on campus it is nicknamed the Back 40. Historically, it has also been known as the Thousand Acres. The forest was part of the Angwin property and a site of lumber even before it was bought by the college. In addition to providing the resources necessary for the expansion of the campus in its early years, the forest has also served as a site for biological research and preservation, enclosing as it does unique species and biodiversity.

In 2018, PUC partnered with the Napa County Land Trust to preserve the forest as a conservation easement; the easement is currently held by CalFire. Covering , the easement protects about half of college's total property. It was valued at $7.1 million, much of it due to vineyard potential. Attempts in the past have been made to develop or sell the land, however:

 In 2006, PUC's Board of Trustees made plans to transform the area into an ecovillage of sevel hundred settlements, in partnership with Triad Development, a Seattle-based construction firm. Although the college downscaled its original plans due to community opposition – primarily by a local NIMBY group, Save Rural Angwin – the board voted in October 2010 to sever its contract with Triad and cancel the project.

Still, with a network of hiking trails spanning 35 miles, the forest sees regular use. In 2019, the college partnered with Napa County's Open Space District to open its trail network to the public. The forest is also a section along the Bay Area Ridge Trail, and was linked in the same year. The 2009 Tour of California, an cycling race held within the state, raced through PUC.

Pacific Union College Church 
Pacific Union College Church is the campus church, built in 1968.  It has 1,800 members in addition to PUC students. The church houses Pacific Union College's notable pipe organ built by Rieger Orgelbau of Austria and installed in 1981. The church complex also has classrooms for theology classes and houses PUC's Office of Service, Justice, and Missions.

Paulin Hall 
Paulin Hall is the home of Pacific Union College's music department as well as the Paulin Center for the Creative Arts, which offers enrichment classes to the community taught by the music and art faculties. Paulin Hall regularly hosts approximately 10 concerts a year featuring student performers as well as guest performers from around the world.

Rasmussen Art Gallery 
The Rasmussen Art Gallery, located in the heart of the Pacific Union College campus mall, offers students and community a stimulating and enriching cultural dimension in the visual arts. The gallery's exhibitions provide exposure to contemporary work as well as to historically significant art. The gallery hosts six shows each school year and features work from invited artists as well as from faculty and students. Previous exhibitions have included artists such as Vernon Nye, Pirkle Jones, John Maxon, Nathan Greene, Arminee Chahbazian, Earl Thollander, and hosts of others. The gallery is run by the visual arts department. The gallery is open regularly 1-5 p.m. on Sunday, Tuesday, Thursday, and Saturday during exhibitions. Gallery admission is free to the public.

Student life
Pacific Union College's stated focus is on undergraduate education. In the fall of 2021, 829 students were enrolled at PUC, 825 of whom were undergraduate students. The school maintains a student/teacher ratio of roughly 12:1. As a residential college, the vast majority of these students live in one of seven on-campus residence halls.

Diversity & Demographics 
Pacific Union College accepts diversity as part of its mission and as a prerequisite for a liberal arts education.  In its Diversity Statement, Pacific Union College states that it understands diversity to include aspects listed in the WSCUC Statement of Diversity: race, ethnicity, socioeconomic class, gender, age, religious belief, sexual orientation and disability. It goes on to state that PUC supports a campus climate of "genuine appreciation, rather than mere tolerance, for community members representing the full range of human diversity."

Within the student body, the three largest ethnic demographics are Hispanic (31% in fall 2021), Asian (23%), and White (21%), while the remaining quarter includes Black students and others. Female students make up a majority of those on campus (63%), while male students comprise roughly over a third (37%). A large majority of students are from California (78%), with only a fraction enrolling from out of state.

The U.S. News & World Report ranks Pacific Union College second out of 219 ranked National Liberal Arts Colleges for Campus Ethnic Diversity. It also ranks PUC as a top 100 National Liberal Arts College for Economic Diversity and Most International Students.

Student Association 
The Pacific Union College Student Association (PUCSA) was started in 1887, just five years after the college was founded. It consists of an executive branch and a Student Senate. PUCSA funds publication of the school's student-run newspaper, the Campus Chronicle, and the college yearbook, the Diogenes Lantern. Recently, the Funnybook ceased print publication and is now accessible exclusively through its website.

Student organizations 
There are more than 50 clubs, Honor's Associations and Student Ministries active on campus at Pacific Union College. These include the Secular Student Alliance, Biology Club, Asian Student Association, Pre-Med Club, Korean Adventist Student Association, Dramatic Arts Society, Musical Arts Symposium, Homeless Ministry, Psi Chi, College Democrats and others. In addition to the Campus Chronicle, there are several other student-run publications a literary periodical, Quicksilver.

Gay and Straight People 
A gay-straight alliance, Gay and Straight People (GASP), has operated on campus since October 2008. It was first organized by a pre-med student named Jonathan Heldt, who established the alliance when he was a senior in the hopes of creating a support group for LGBTQ students and their allies. Originally intending to form an official club, Heldt's proposal was rejected by PUC's Advisory Council.

Students and faculty continue to meet regularly to discuss LGBTQ issues. Though the club remains formally unrecognized by the college, the group contributed to the expansion of all-gender bathrooms on campus, and has had presence at the college's student orientation and club fairs.

In December 2022, the Student Senate passed a bill calling for GASP's recognition as an official club, though it has yet to be addressed by administration.

Athletics 
The Pacific Union athletic teams are called the Pioneers. The college is a member of the National Association of Intercollegiate Athletics (NAIA), primarily competing in the California Pacific Conference (CalPac) since the 1996–97 academic year.

Pacific Union competes in eight intercollegiate sports: Men's sports include basketball, cross country, soccer and volleyball; while women's sports include basketball, cross country, soccer and volleyball.

Accomplishments 
PUC has been awarded the "California Pacific Conference Team Sportsmanship Award" five times since 2003, most recently for the 2010–2011 school year. In fall 2011, the coaches for varsity women's volleyball and men's soccer described it as "rebuilding" time. This award signifies the school that displays outstanding sportsmanship and exemplifies the true spirit of the "Champions of Character" program set forth by the NAIA.

Intramurals 
PUC maintains an active intramural athletic program under the name RecRadio.org. The intramural athletic program is the top intramural athletics program in the country according to College Prowler's "Best Intramural Sports" ranking.

Alumni 

Pacific Union College has produced a large number of distinguished alumni for a school of its size. It has been noted for being the "training ground for an inordinately large number of outstanding physicians, dentists, nurses, teachers and theologians" who make up part of its over 50,000 alumni. PUC's notable alumni include members of the United States Congress and California State Assembly; a Harlem Renaissance poet, a professional smooth jazz saxophonist, and others in the arts; multiple presidents of the World Seventh-day Adventist Church, judges, the founder of the Loma Linda University Medical Center, Adventist Health Glendale; presidents of many institutions of higher education including the University of Houston. Notable alumni also include numerous scientists, professors, television personalities and a surgeon in the Japanese Imperial Army.

Notes

References

Further reading

External links 

 
 Official athletics website

 
Liberal arts colleges in California
Universities and colleges in Napa County, California
Art schools in California
Business schools in California
Music schools in California
Nursing schools in California
Pharmacy schools in California
Universities and colleges affiliated with the Seventh-day Adventist Church
Schools accredited by the Western Association of Schools and Colleges
Vaca Mountains
Educational institutions established in 1882
1882 establishments in California
Private universities and colleges in California